Pivotal Labs was an agile software development consulting firm headquartered in San Francisco, California. The company developed Pivotal Tracker workflow software. It was a division of Pivotal Software.

History
The company was founded in 1989 by Rob Mee and Sherry Erskine.  In 2008 Pivotal Labs released Pivotal Tracker, which was used as their internal project management and collaboration software. EMC acquired Pivotal Labs, and in March 2013, Pivotal Software was formed after spinning out of EMC and VMware. 

In October 2013, Pivotal acquired Toronto-based Xtreme Labs, a mobile app development company. Xtreme Labs' clients included Microsoft and Groupon.

In December 2019, Pivotal Labs was acquired by VMware and renamed VMware Tanzu Labs.

Products and Services 
The company will use pair programming while doing its software development and also consults to other companies to help them use the method. The company has provided consulting programming for several large technology companies in San Francisco.

References

External links 
 
 Pivotal Tracker site
 Get Agile With Pivotal Tracker by Dan Podsedly on Vimeo

Consulting firms established in 1989
1989 establishments in California
2012 mergers and acquisitions
Pivotal Software
1989 establishments in the United States
Companies established in 1989
Defunct software companies of the United States